{{DISPLAYTITLE:C19H25ClN2O2}}
The molecular formula C19H25ClN2O2 (molar mass: 348.87 g/mol, exact mass: 348.1605 u) may refer to:

 NNC 38-1049
 Zatosetron (LY-277,359)